Al-Shadbakhtiyah Madrasa is a 12th-century madrasah complex in Aleppo, Syria. It was built by Jamal al-Din Shadbakht, an Indian slave who was freed by Nur ad-Din, and served as a lieutenant of the citadel at his master's death in 1174.

See also
 Al-Firdaws Madrasa
 Al-Sultaniyah Madrasa
 Al-Uthmaniyah Madrasa
 Al-Zahiriyah Madrasa
 Ancient City of Aleppo
 Khusruwiyah Mosque

References

Bibliography

Buildings and structures completed in the 12th century
Ayyubid architecture in Syria
Mausoleums in Syria
Madrasas in Aleppo